Dr. Charles Kenneth Gunn discovered a mutant rat in 1934 at the Connaught Laboratory in Toronto, Canada. These rats were jaundiced and the defect (a lack of the enzyme uridine diphosphate glucuronyltransferase) was transmitted as an autosomal recessive characteristic. Gunn, a geneticist, bred them at Connaught and later moved to Summerside, Prince Edward Island, Canada, to head up the Canadian Experimental Fox Ranch. This animal model has been extremely valuable for the development of experimental treatments for Crigler–Najjar syndrome.

References 

Laboratory rat strains